is a reservoir located near the Meiji Mura theme park in Inuyama, Aichi, Japan.

In 1868 the dam holding the reservoir collapsed after heavy rain. In the resulting flood, 941 people lost their lives.

Gallery

References 

Tourist attractions in Aichi Prefecture
Iruka
Landforms of Aichi Prefecture